The Journal of the History of Medicine and Allied Sciences is a quarterly peer-reviewed academic journal that was originally published by the Department of the History of Medicine at Yale University and now is continued by Oxford University Press. It covers research on the history of medicine and was established in 1946. The editor-in-chief is Christopher Crenner (University of Kansas School of Medicine). According to the Journal Citation Reports, the journal has a 2011 impact factor of 0.714.

References

External links
 

Publications established in 1946
History of medicine journals
Quarterly journals
Oxford University Press academic journals
English-language journals